Dimethoate is a widely used organophosphate insecticide and acaricide. It was patented and introduced in the 1950s by American Cyanamid. Like other organophosphates, dimethoate is an acetylcholinesterase inhibitor which disables cholinesterase, an enzyme essential for central nervous system function.  It acts both by contact and through ingestion. It is readily absorbed and distributed throughout plant tissues, and is degraded relatively rapidly.

Fruit Fly Control Efforts 
The Queensland fruit fly, or Bactrocera tryoni, is a tephritid fly species that has caused more than $28.5 million a year in damage to Australian fruit crops. In order to combat infestation, farmers treated crops with dimethoate and fenthion. However, the use of these chemicals was banned in 2011 due to safety concerns.

Trade names
Rogor 
B-58 (sometimes referred to as preparation B-58), produced in Russia.

Poisoning Incidents
In late October 2020 a Bulgarian farmer, a previous jackpot winner of the national 'toto' lottery drank a glass of the russian B-58 brand, as of early November 2020 he is hospitalised in a comatose condition, he has a history of psychiatric issues but it is currently unknown whether the incident was accidental or intentional.

References

External links 
 EPA Report on Dimethoate 

Acetylcholinesterase inhibitors
Organophosphate insecticides
Phosphorodithioates
Carboxamides